The Plouffe Family is a 1981 Canadian drama film, based on Roger Lemelin's novel about the titular Plouffe family, set during World War II. The film was Canada's submission to the Academy Award for Best Foreign Language Film in 1981, but was not shortlisted as a nominee for the award.

Production
Roger Lemelin was paid $250,000 to write the script. The film was shot from 19 August to 5 December 1980, on a budget of $4.8 million with $250,000 coming from the SDICC.

Release
The film premiered in Quebec City on 7 April 1981, and later shown at the 1981 Cannes Film Festival. It was distributed by Ciné 360 in Quebec and by Ambassador Film Distributors in the rest of Canada.

Reception
The film was seen by 191,294 people in France.

See also
 La famille Plouffe television series aired in the 1950s
 The Crime of Ovide Plouffe 1984 film and 1986 miniseries
 List of submissions to the 54th Academy Awards for Best Foreign Language Film
 List of Canadian submissions for the Academy Award for Best Foreign Language Film

References

Works cited

External links
 

1981 films
1981 drama films
Films based on Canadian novels
English-language Canadian films
Films directed by Gilles Carle
Films set in Quebec City
French-language Canadian films
Canadian drama films